Sokolovac is a settlement in the region of Baranja, Croatia. Administratively, it is located in the Kneževi Vinogradi municipality within the Osijek-Baranja County. Population is 55 people.

Ethnic groups (2001 census)
26 - Serbs
8 - Hungarians
6 - Croats
15 - others

References

Kneževi Vinogradi
Serb communities in Croatia